Ortigas station is an elevated Manila Metro Rail Transit (MRT) station situated on Line 3. The station is located in the Mandaluyong portion of Ortigas Center (under the barangay of Wack Wack Greenhills East) and is named after either Ortigas Center or Ortigas Avenue, which is nearby.

Ortigas station is the sixth station for trains headed to Taft Avenue and the eighth station for trains headed to North Avenue. The station is notorious for having a narrow sidewalk on its east exit, which forces commuters to squeeze through the sidewalk and its fencing along EDSA due to legal right-of-way issues with the Asian Development Bank and its headquarters next to the station itself.

Sidewalk issues
The station is notorious among commuters for having a very narrow sidewalk along EDSA at its east exit. Furthermore, the escalator on the east side, which uses up most of the sidewalk space on EDSA, leaves pedestrians no choice but to squeeze through the narrow remainder of the sidewalk in between the side of the escalator and the sidewalk fencing. During the opening of the line in 1999, the Metro Rail Transit Corporation (MRTC) stated that the Asian Development Bank, whose headquarters is located next to the station, "refuses to give MRTC the right-of-way" due to the ADB property having a "quasi-sovereign component" under their agreement with the Philippine government. As of 2022, there have been no updates on resolving this issue.

Nearby landmarks
The station serves the Ortigas business district and is located beside the Asian Development Bank headquarters. It is near major shopping malls, such as Robinsons Galleria, SM Megamall, The Podium and St. Francis Square Mall; as well as the headquarters of the Meralco, UnionBank, Robinsons Bank and JG Summit Holdings. A few government buildings are also located in the station's vicinity including the central offices of the Securities and Exchange Commission and the Philippine Overseas Employment Administration, the Ortigas office of the Department of Transportation, and the Philippine Railways Institute, as well as educational institutions like Saint Pedro Poveda College and La Salle Green Hills. The EDSA Shrine, Meralco Theater, Lopez Museum, The Medical City, Eton Cyberpod, Holiday Inn, Crowne Plaza and Oakwood Premier hotels are also nearby.

West of the station is the gate to Wack Wack village at Berkeley Street, where the Wack Wack Golf and Country Club is located.

Transportation links
Buses, jeepneys and taxis serve the station, but passengers may board them from either Robinson's Galleria (buses, jeepneys, taxis, UV Express) or SM Megamall (buses, taxis, UV Express). A bus stop of EDSA Busway is located just next to the station, accessible through the southbound platform. Buses ply both EDSA and Ortigas Avenue routes, while jeepneys ply along Ortigas Avenue for routes heading to Pasig and the province of Rizal to the east, and San Juan and the City of Manila to the west. Passengers bound for Clark International Airport may ride either a Philtranco bus at the back of SM Megamall Building A or a Genesis Transport point-to-point (P2P) bus at Robinsons Galleria.

See also

List of rail transit stations in Metro Manila
Manila Metro Rail Transit System Line 3

References 

Manila Metro Rail Transit System stations
Railway stations opened in 1999
Buildings and structures in Mandaluyong
1999 establishments in the Philippines